"Fuck tha Police" is a protest song by American hip hop group N.W.A that appears on the 1988 album Straight Outta Compton as well as on the N.W.A's Greatest Hits compilation. The lyrics protest police brutality and racial profiling and the song was ranked number 425 on Rolling Stones 2004 list of the 500 Greatest Songs of All Time. In 2021, Rolling Stone re-ranked the song at number 190 in an updated list.

Since its release in 1988, the "Fuck the Police" slogan continues to influence popular culture in the form of T-shirts, artwork, political expression, and has transitioned into other genres as seen in the cover versions by Bone Thugs-n-Harmony, Dope, Rage Against the Machine, and Kottonmouth Kings (featuring Insane Clown Posse).

Composition 
"Fuck tha Police" parodies court proceedings, inverting them by presenting Dr. Dre as a judge hearing a prosecution of the police department. Three members of the group, Ice Cube, MC Ren, and Eazy-E, take the stand to "testify" before the judge as prosecutors. Through the lyrics, the rappers criticize the local police force. Two interludes present re-enactments of stereotypical racial profiling and police brutality.

At the end, the jury finds the police department guilty of being a "redneck, white-bread, chicken-shit motherfucker." A police officer, who is revealed to be the defendant, contests that the arguments presented were all lies and starts to demand justice as Dr. Dre orders him out of the courtroom, prompting the police officer to yell obscenities as he is led out.

FBI letter
The song prompted the FBI to write to N.W.A's record company about the lyrics, expressing disapproval and arguing that the song misrepresented police.

In his autobiography Ruthless, the band's manager Jerry Heller wrote that the letter was actually a rogue action by a "single pissed-off bureaucrat with a bully pulpit" named Milt Ahlerich, who was falsely purporting to represent the FBI as a whole and that the action "earned him a transfer to the Bureau's backwater Hartford office". Heller also wrote that he removed all sensitive documents from the office of Ruthless Records in case of an FBI raid.

In the letter, Ahlerich went on to reference "78 law enforcement officers" who were "feloniously slain in the line of duty during 1988" and that recordings such as those produced by N.W.A "were both discouraging and degrading to these brave, dedicated officers". Ahlerich did not mention any N.W.A song by name in the letter, but later confirmed he was referring to "Fuck tha Police".

Censorship

In 1989, Australian youth radio station Triple J had been playing "Fuck tha Police" (the only radio station in the world to do so) for up to six months, before being banned by Australian Broadcasting Corporation management following a campaign by a South Australian Liberal senator. As a reaction, Triple J staff went on strike and put N.W.A's "Express Yourself" on continuous play from 9am until 4.30pm (AEST), totalling 82 plays. The song was preceded on each occasion by a speech explaining that due to industrial action, normal transmission had been interrupted. It was revealed in 2005 that the scratch sound from that track was sampled for the Triple J news theme.

On 10 April 2011, New Zealand musician Tiki Taane was arrested on charges of "disorderly behaviour likely to cause violence to start or continue" after performing the song at a gig in a club in Tauranga during an inspection of the club by the police. On 13 April, Tiki told Marcus Lush on Radio Live that the lyrics often feature in his performances and his arrest came as a complete surprise.

Notable references in popular culture

 Dr. Dre referenced the song on his 1999 single "Forgot About Dre" from his 2001 album with the line "Who you think brought you the oldies, Eazy-Es, Ice Cubes, and D.O.C.s, the Snoop D.O. Double Gs, and the group that said 'Motherfuck the police'?".
 The song and the group were parodied in the 1994 hip-hop mockumentary film Fear of a Black Hat and its soundtrack album, as a single for the fictional gangsta-rap group N.W.H. (Niggaz With Hats) as "Fuck the Security Guards."
 It is prominently featured in the 2015 biopic of N.W.A, also called Straight Outta Compton.
 The song was satirically referenced in South Parks season 19 episode "Naughty Ninjas", when the townspeople are protesting the police.
 Former group member Ice Cube also sampled the song on the track "Late Night Hour" from his 2001 Greatest Hits album, which was based on the sample of his then-group of the same name.
 The song is also heard in the 2019 film Us, where Kitty Tyler, portrayed by Elisabeth Moss tells the voice assistant, Ophelia, to "Call the police", causing the device to play the song before she is killed by her Tethered counterpart.

Charts

Certifications

See also 

 "Cop Killer"
 "The Guns of Brixton", a 1979 song by The Clash born of similar frustration with police tactics
 Rodney King
 1992 Los Angeles riots
 George Floyd protests
 Driving while black
 Police brutality in the United States

References

1988 singles
N.W.A songs
Songs about police brutality
Songs about police officers
Songs against racism and xenophobia
Protest songs
Hardcore hip hop songs
Songs written by MC Ren
Songs written by Ice Cube
Song recordings produced by Dr. Dre
Criticism of police brutality
Political rap songs
Songs written by The D.O.C.
1988 songs
Ruthless Records singles
Law enforcement controversies in the United States
Obscenity controversies in music
African-American-related controversies